Daniel Grigore (born 22 July 1969) is a Romanian fencer. He competed in the individual and team sabre events at the 1992 Summer Olympics.

References

External links
 

1969 births
Living people
Romanian male fencers
Romanian sabre fencers
Olympic fencers of Romania
Fencers at the 1992 Summer Olympics